Adurbadagan (Middle Persian: Ādurbādagān/Āδarbāyagān, Parthian: Āturpātākān) was a Sasanian province located in northern Iran, almost corresponded to the present-day Iranian Azerbaijan. Governed by a marzban ("margrave"), it functioned as an important frontier (and later religious) region against the neighbouring country of Armenia.

The capital of the province was Ganzak.

Etymology 
Ādurbādagān is the Middle Persian spelling of the Parthian Āturpātākān, which is derived from the name of the former satrap of the area, Atropates (Āturpāt). It is attested in Georgian as Adarbadagan and in Armenian as Atrpatakan.

Geography 
While Middle Persian texts are vague and incomprehensible about the geography of Adurbadagan, New Persian and Arabic texts are more clear. According to the 9th-century Persian geographer Ibn Khordadbeh, the following cities were part of the province; Ardabil, Bagavan, Balwankirgh, Barza, Barzand, Ghabrawan, Ganzak, Khuy, Kulsarah, Maragha, Marand, Muqan, Shapurkhwast, Sisar, T'awrezh, Nariz, Urmia, Salmas, Shiz, and Warthan (Vardanakert), which he considered the northmost point of Adurbadagan. The southern extent of the province was at the city of Sisar. Maragha was the main city of the western part, while Ardabil was the main city in the eastern part. The Middle Persian geography text Šahrestānīhā ī Ērānšahr mentions a major city in Adurbadagan named "Shahrestan i Adurbadagan", which may have been another name for Ardabil. The capital of the province was Ganzak.

When the Arsacid house of Armenia was abolished and the country was made a Sasanian province in 428, the Armenian districts of Parskahayk and Paytakaran were incorporated into Adurbadagan. The northern extent of Adurbadagan was enlarged in 571 with the inclusion of the Armenian district of Sisanak (Siwnik).

History

Since  the area of Adurbadagan had been ruled by local dynasties, initially by Atropates and his descendants, and a branch of the Parthian Arsacids from the 1st-century AD. During the late Parthian era, the empire was declining, resulting in the weakening of hold over western Iran. The Iranologist Touraj Daryaee argues that the reign of the Parthian monarch Vologases V was "the turning point in Arsacid history, in that the dynasty lost much of its prestige." The people of Adurbadagan (both nobility and peasantry) allied themselves with the Persian Sasanian prince Ardashir I during his wars against Vologases V's son and second successor Artabanus IV. In 226, Adurbadagan submitted with little resistance to Ardashir I after he had defeated and killed Artabanus IV at the Battle of Hormozdgan. Ardashir I and his son and heir Shapur I are depicted in a rock relief near Salmas, possibly a testimonial to the Sasanian conquest of Adurbadagan. The nobility of Adurbadagan most likely allied themselves the Sasanians due to a desire for a strong state capable of maintaining order. The priesthood, who may have felt alienated by the easy-going Arsacids, probably also supported the Sasanian family, due to its association with Zoroastrianism.

The events that occurred during the early Sasanian period increased the importance of Adurbadagan. While the Parthian Empire fell in Iran, their collateral line in Armenia prevented Ardashir I from conquering Armenia (or least all of it). Although Armenia was finally conquered by Shapur I in 252, the country would continue to prove problematic for the Sasanians, even more it converted to Christianity. As a result, Adurbadagan had been since the advent of the Sasanians fortified into a military bastion, and then religious one. However, in 241/2, Shapur I had to mount an expedition in Adurbadagan to quell unrest. After that, the province seemingly became completely subdued.

Under Kavad I and his son and successor Khosrow I the empire was divided into four frontier regions (kust in Middle Persian), with a military commander (spahbed) in charge of each district. The frontier regions were known as xwarāsān (East), xwarārān (West), nēmrōz (South) and abāxtar (North). Due to negative connotations, the term abāxtar was substituted with the name of Adurbadagan. Due to sharing the same name, the kust of Adurbadagan and its namesake province were often incorrectly seen as being the same in sources. The province of Adurbadagan, along with provinces such as Gilan and Caucasian Albania were part of the northern quarter.

In August 591, the Battle of Blarathon took place near Ganzak, between Khosrow II's forces and the rebel forces of Bahram Chobin. However, not long after the battle, Khosrow II's maternal uncle Vistahm rebelled (precise date unknown, 590/1–596 or 594/5–600), and managed to gain control of some parts of Adurbadagan. He was, however, defeated by Khosrow II and the Sasanian general Smbat IV Bagratuni. During the Byzantine–Sasanian War of 602–628, the fire temple of Adur Gushnasp was sacked in 623/4 by the Byzantine emperor Heraclius. The Iranians succeeded in saving the fire, which they later restored to the temple, which was quickly rebuilt. The apocalyptical Middle Persian text Zand-i Wahman yasn may report some form of contemporary memory of the destruction of the temple; "They will remove Adur Gushnasp from its place . . . on account of (the devastation of) these armies, Adur Gushnasp will be carried to Padishkhwargar."

In 651, the Arabs invaded Adurbadagan, which was the domain of the Ispahbudhan brothers Isfandyadh and Bahram. Isfandyadh made a stand against the Arabs, where a battle was fought. He was, however, defeated and captured by the Arabs. While Isfandyadh was in captivity, he told the Arab general Bukayr ibn Abdallah, that if he sought to conquer Adurbadagan easily and peacefully, he should make peace with him. According to Bal'ami, Isfandyadh is known to have said that: "If you [were to] kill me all of Adurbadagan [will] rise in avenging my blood, and will wage war against you." The Arab general accepted Isfandyadh's advice and made peace with him. However, Bahram, the brother of Isfandyadh, refused to submit to the Arab forces and kept resisting them. Although he was quickly defeated by the Arabs, and was forced to flee from Adurbadagan. Adurbadagan thus came under Arab suzerainty.

Religious importance

Population 
The majority of the population in Adurbadagan were Western-Iranian ethnic groups who practised Zoroastrianism, and spoke Adhari (including its dialect Tati). With the incorporation of Armenian districts in 428 and 527, Adurbadagan also had an Armenian population.

Notes

References

Sources
 
 
 
 
 
  
 
 
 
 
 
 
  
 
 

 
 
 
  

Provinces of the Sasanian Empire
States and territories disestablished in the 7th century
History of Azerbaijan (Iran)
224 establishments
States and territories established in the 220s
651 disestablishments
History of Talysh
Atropatene